Ehsan Haddadi (born 20 January 1985, in Tehran) is an Iranian discus thrower. His height is 193 cm and his weight is 127 kg.

The 2004 Asian Junior Champion, he won a gold medal at the 2004 World Junior Championships In Grosseto, the inaugural Iranian to win a medal at any global athletics competition. In 2005 he won the Asian Championships in Incheon with a throw of 65.25 metres. In December 2006, he added another gold medal to his record, winning the title at the 2006 Asian Games in Doha, Qatar. In 2007, he won the Asian Championships in Amman and defended his title.

His personal best throw is 69.32 m, achieved on June 3, 2008, in Tallinn, Estonia. This is the current Asian record. Because of his good performance over the whole season 2008, he was considered a medal contender entering the 2008 Summer Olympics, but he ranked 17th with a 61.34-meter throw and failed to qualify for the final; Haddadi blamed his poor results on his injuries.

After more than a year's absence due to shoulder surgery, In November 2009, he won his third in a row continental title in Guangzhou.

After winning 2010 Asian Games in Guangzhou and 2011 Asian Championship in Kobe, Haddadi made history by becoming the first Iranian athlete to win a medal at IAAF World Championships in Athletics, he won bronze in 2011 World Championships in Athletics in Daegu.

Haddadi competed and won a silver medal at the 2012 Summer Olympics with a 68.18 m throw. Iranian athletes have participated in the Olympic Games since 1948 and before Haddadi's silver medal, had only attained medals in wrestling, Olympian weightlifting, and taekwondo. His achievement was a milestone in Iran's Olympic history in that it ended Iran's 64-year-old medal drought in events other than the aforementioned.

Haddadi offered his silver medal to children with cancer, and travelled to Azerbaijan to gather funds for the 2012 earthquakes' victims. On 27 March 2020, Haddadi announced he tests positive for COVID-19 during the pandemic in Iran.

International competitions

''* 1.750 kg discus

References

External links

 Official Website
 
 Ehsan Hadadi wins historical gold for Iran in Grosseto – IAAF, 18 July 2004

1985 births
Living people
Iranian male discus throwers
Olympic athletes of Iran
Olympic silver medalists for Iran
Medalists at the 2012 Summer Olympics
Athletes (track and field) at the 2008 Summer Olympics
Athletes (track and field) at the 2012 Summer Olympics
Athletes (track and field) at the 2016 Summer Olympics
World Athletics Championships medalists
Asian Games gold medalists for Iran
Asian Games medalists in athletics (track and field)
Athletes (track and field) at the 2006 Asian Games
Athletes (track and field) at the 2010 Asian Games
Athletes (track and field) at the 2014 Asian Games
Athletes (track and field) at the 2018 Asian Games
Persepolis club sportspeople
World Athletics Championships athletes for Iran
Olympic silver medalists in athletics (track and field)
Medalists at the 2006 Asian Games
Medalists at the 2010 Asian Games
Medalists at the 2014 Asian Games
Medalists at the 2018 Asian Games
Asian Athletics Championships winners
Asian Games gold medalists in athletics (track and field)
Islamic Solidarity Games competitors for Iran
Islamic Solidarity Games medalists in athletics
Athletes (track and field) at the 2020 Summer Olympics
21st-century Iranian people